Adam Campbell (born 1 January 1995) is an English professional footballer who plays as a striker for  club Gateshead.

He played in the Premier League for Newcastle United, in the Scottish Premiership for St Mirren, in the Football League for Carlisle United, Fleetwood Town, Hartlepool United, Notts County and Morecambe, and in the National League North for Darlington. He represented England at under-16, under-17 and under-19 levels.

Club career

Newcastle United
Campbell was born in North Shields and attended St Bernadette's R.C Primary School in Wallsend as well as St Thomas More R.C High School in North Shields from 2006 to 2011. He is a product of Wallsend Boys Club. 

Campbell won the Most Valuable Player award at the 2010 Nike Cup at Old Trafford. In addition, Campbell was named Premier Player of the Tournament at the 2012 Milk Cup.

He made his competitive debut against Atromitos in the UEFA Europa League on 23 August 2012, aged 17 years and 236 days, becoming the youngest player to play for Newcastle in European competition. Campbell made his Premier League debut for Newcastle United on 10 March 2013, taking up a position on the left wing. He came off the bench late in the second half in a 2–1 win against Stoke City, making a pass to Sylvain Marveaux who assisted Papiss Cissé for the winner.

Loan spells
Campbell scored both Newcastle goals in a 2–1 win in a pre-season friendly against Gateshead in August 2013. On 15 August, Campbell joined Carlisle United on a one-month loan. He made his debut two days later, coming on at half-time in a 4–0 loss to Coventry City. Later that month, he was recalled from his loan. Campbell joined Scottish Premiership club St Mirren on 1 January 2014 on loan until the end of the season. He scored on his debut the next day in a 2–1 defeat away to Kilmarnock, and ended his loan spell with 12 appearances and two goals. On 7 August 2014, Campbell joined League One club Fleetwood Town on a one-month loan. He failed to score in four appearances for the club. Campbell was loaned to League Two club Hartlepool United for a month on 21 November, and made two league appearances without scoring. On 16 January 2015, Campbell and Callum Roberts signed for Gateshead on a 28-day youth loan. Two days later, he scored both goals on his debut in a 2–0 win over Nuneaton Town.

Notts County
In July 2015 Campbell signed for Notts County.

Morecambe
In June 2017 Campbell signed for Morecambe. He scored his first goal for the club in a 2–1 loss at Barnet on 16 December 2017. On 3 August 2018, Campbell joined fellow League Two club Carlisle United on loan until January.

He was released by Morecambe at the end of the 2018–19 season.

Non-league football
Following his release from Morecambe, Campbell signed for National League North club Darlington on 3 July 2019, and finished his first season as top scorer with 16 goals (15 in league competition). He played and scored regularly in 2020–21 before the National League North was abandoned because of COVID-19 pandemic-related issues, and left the club at the end of that season.

Campbell rejoined Gateshead on 5 May 2021.

International career
Campbell earned his only under-16 cap against Northern Ireland in the Victory Shield on 23 March 2011. In February 2012, he represented the under-17 team at the Algarve Tournament in Portugal, scoring once in three appearances. He made his under-19 debut as a 55th-minute substitute in a friendly match against Turkey on 21 March 2013.

Career statistics

References

External links
Player profile Newcastle United
Adam Campbell The Football Association

1995 births
Living people
Sportspeople from North Shields
Footballers from Tyne and Wear
English footballers
England youth international footballers
Association football forwards
Wallsend Boys Club players
Newcastle United F.C. players
Carlisle United F.C. players
St Mirren F.C. players
Fleetwood Town F.C. players
Hartlepool United F.C. players
Gateshead F.C. players
Notts County F.C. players
Morecambe F.C. players
Darlington F.C. players
Premier League players
English Football League players
Scottish Professional Football League players
National League (English football) players